In tabletop games and video games, game mechanics are the rules or ludemes that govern and guide the player's actions, as well as the game's response to them. A rule is an instruction on how to play, a ludeme is an element of play like the L-shaped move of the knight in chess. A game's mechanics thus effectively specify how the game will work for the people who play it.

There are no  accepted definitions of game mechanics. Some competing definitions include the opinion that game mechanics are "systems of interactions between the player and the game", that they "are more than what the player may recognize, they are only those things that impact the play experience", and "In tabletop games and video games, 'game mechanics' are the rules and procedures that guide the player and the game response to the player's moves or actions".

All games use mechanics; however, there are different theories as to their ultimate importance to the game. In general, the process and study of game design are efforts to come up with game mechanics that allow for people playing a game to have an engaging, but not necessarily fun, experience. The interaction of various game mechanics in a game determines the complexity and level of player interaction in the game, and in conjunction with the game's environment and resources determine game balance. Some forms of game mechanics have been used in games for centuries, while others are relatively new, having been invented within the past decade.

Game mechanics vs. gameplay
Gameplay could be defined as the combination and interaction of many elements of a game. However, there is some confusion as to the difference between game mechanics and gameplay. For some, gameplay is nothing more than a set of game mechanics. For others, gameplay—especially when referenced in the term of "basic gameplay"—refers to certain core game mechanics which determine the overall characteristics of the game itself.

For example, the basic gameplay of a shooting or fighting video game is to hit while not being hit. In a graphic adventure game, the basic gameplay is usually to solve puzzles related to the context. The basic gameplay of poker is to produce certain numerical or categorical combinations. Golf's basic gameplay is to hit a ball and reach a designated spot.

The goal of these games is slightly different from the gameplay itself. For example, while reaching the end of a stage (in platform games), defeating the boss, advancing your characters' progress through the story (RPGs) or sinking the ball into a hole (golf) may be the purpose of playing a game, the fun is derived primarily by the means and the process in which such a goal is achieved. Basic gameplay defines what a game is, to the player, while game mechanics determine the parts of which the entire game consists.

In video games, gamers have a well-defined notion of what is considered gameplay. This is:
 What the player can do
 What other entities can do, in response to player's actions
What a player and other entities can do within a game would also fall under the mechanics of a game.

However, from a programming or overall design perspective, basic gameplay can be deconstructed further to reveal constituent game mechanics. For example, the basic gameplay of fighting game can be deconstructed to attack and defense, or punch, kick, block, dodge and throw; which can be further deconstructed to strong/weak punch/kick. For this reason, game mechanics is more of an engineering concept while gameplay is more of a design concept.

Game mechanics vs. theme
Some games are 'abstract'—that is, the action is not intended to represent anything; Go is one famous example. Other games have a 'theme'—some element of representation. Monopoly is a famous example where the events of the game are intended to represent another activity, in this case, the buying and selling of properties.

Games that are mechanically similar can vary widely in theme. Eurogames often feature relatively simple systems, and stress the mechanics, with the theme merely being a context to place the mechanics in.

Some wargames, at the other extreme, are known for complex rules and for attempts at detailed simulation.

Key game mechanics categories
Game mechanics fall into several more or less well-defined categories, which (along with basic gameplay and theme) are sometimes used as a basis to classify games.

Turns

A game turn is an important fundamental concept to almost all non-computer games, and many video games as well (although in video games, various real-time genres have become much more popular). In general, a turn is a segment of the game set aside for certain actions to happen before moving on to the next turn, where the sequence of events can largely repeat. In a truly abstract game (backgammon) turns are nothing more than a means to regulate play. In less abstract games (Risk), turns obviously denote the passage of time, but the amount of time is not clear, nor important. In simulation games, time is generally more concrete. Wargames usually specify the amount of time each turn represents, and in sports games a turn is usually distinctly one 'play', although the amount of time a play or turn takes can vary.

Some games use player turns where one player gets to perform their actions before another player can perform any on their turn (Monopoly and chess would be classic examples). Some use game turns, where all players contribute to the actions of a single turn (board-game simulations of American football tend to have both players pick plays and then determine the outcome; each 'play' or 'down' can be considered a turn). Some games have 'game turns' that consist of a round of player turns, possibly with other actions added in (Civilization plays with a series of player turns followed by a trading round in which all players participate).

In games that are meant to be some sort of simulation, the on/off nature of player turns can cause problems and has led to a few extra variations on the theme. The semi-simultaneous turn allows for some reactions to be done during the other player's turn. The impulse-based turn divides the turn into smaller segments or impulses where everyone does some of their actions at one time, and then reacts to the current situation before moving on to the next impulse (as seen in Star Fleet Battles or Car Wars).

In some games, not all turns are alike. Usually, this is a difference in what phases (or different portions of the turn) happen. Imperium Romanum II for instance, features a "Taxation and Mobilization Phase" in every third turn (month), which does not occur in the other turns. Napoleon has an unusual variation on the idea, where every third player turn is 'night turn' where combat is not allowed.

Even in real-time computer games, there are often certain periodic effects. For instance, a wounded character in World of Warcraft will gradually recover health while out of combat. The rate of recovery is calculated from the character's statistics and applied per "tick" as a lump sum, so a character would gain ten health per tick, instead of one every tenth of a tick. These periodic effects can be considered the vestigial remnants of the concept of turns.

Action points

These control what players may do on their turns in the game by allocating each player a budget of "action points" each turn. These points may be spent on various actions according to the game rules, such as moving pieces, drawing cards, collecting money, etc. This type of mechanism is common in many "German-style board games".

Auction or bidding
Some games use an auction or bidding system in which the players make competitive bids to determine which player gets the right to perform particular actions. Such an auction can be based on different forms of "payment":
 The winning bidder must pay for the won privilege with some form of game resource (game money, points, etc.) (e.g.: Ra).
 The winning bidder does not pay upon winning the auction, but an auction is a form of a promise that the winner will achieve some outcome in the near future. If this outcome is not achieved, the bidder pays some form of penalty. Such a system is used in many trick-taking games, such as contract bridge.

In some games the auction determines a unique player who gains the privilege; in others, the auction orders all players into a sequence, often the sequence in which they take turns during the current round of gameplay.

Cards

These involve the use of cards similar to playing cards to act as a randomizer and/or to act as tokens to keep track of states in the game.

A common use is for a deck of cards to be shuffled and placed face down on or near the game playing area. When a random result is called for, a player draws a card and what is printed on the card determines the outcome of the result.

Another use of cards occurs when players draw cards and retain them for later use in the game, without revealing them to other players. When used in this fashion, cards form a game resource.

Capture/eliminate

In some games, the number of tokens a player has on the playing surface is related to their current strength in the game. In such games, it can be an important goal to capture opponent's tokens, meaning to remove them from the playing surface.

Captures can be achieved in a number of ways:
 Moving one of one's own tokens into a space occupied by an opposing token (e.g. chess, parchisi).
 Jumping a token over the space occupied by an opposing token (e.g. draughts).
 Declaring an "attack" on an opposing token, and then determining the outcome of the attack, either in a deterministic way by the game rules (e.g. Stratego, Illuminati), or by using a randomising method (e.g. Illuminati: New World Order).
 Surrounding a token or region with one's own tokens in some manner (e.g. go).
 Playing cards or other resources that the game allows to be used to capture tokens.

In some games, captured tokens are simply removed and play no further part in the game (e.g. chess). In others, captured tokens are removed but can return to play later in the game under various rules (e.g. backgammon, pachisi). Less common is the case in which the capturing player takes possession of the captured tokens and can use them himself later in the game (e.g. shogi, Reversi, Illuminati).

Many video games express the capture mechanism in the form of a kill count, (sometimes referred to as "frags"), reflecting the number of opposing pawns eliminated during the game.

Catch-up
Some games include a mechanism designed to make progress towards victory more difficult the closer a player gets to it. The idea behind this is to allow trailing players a chance to catch up and potentially still win the game, rather than suffer an inevitable loss once they fall behind. This may be desirable in games such as racing games that have a fixed finish line.

An example is from The Settlers of Catan. This game contains a neutral piece (the robber), which debilitates the resource generation of players whose territories it is near. Players occasionally get to move the robber, and frequently choose to position it where it will cause maximal disruption to the player currently winning the game.

Another example, often seen in racing games, such as Chutes and Ladders is by requiring rolling or spinning the exact number needed to reach the finish line; e.g., if a player is only four spaces from the finish line then they must roll a four on the die or land on the four with the spinner. If more than four is rolled, then the turn is forfeited to the next player.

Other games do the reverse, making the player in the lead more capable of winning, such as in Monopoly, and thus the game is drawn to an end sooner. This may be desirable in zero-sum games.

Dice

These involve the use of dice, usually as randomisers. Most dice used in games are the standard cubical dice numbered from 1 to 6, though games with polyhedral dice or those marked with symbols other than numbers exist.

The most common use of dice is to randomly determine the outcome of an interaction in a game. An example is a player rolling a die or dice to determine how many board spaces to move a game token.

Dice often determine the outcomes of in-game conflict between players, with different outcomes of the die/dice roll of different benefit (or adverse effect) to each player involved. This is useful in games that simulate direct conflicts of interest.

Engine building
Engine building is a mechanism that involves building and optimizing a system to create a flow of resources. SimCity is an example of an engine-building video game: money activates building mechanisms, which in turn unlock feedback loops between many internal resources such as people, job vacancies, power, transport capacity, and zone types. In engine-building board games, the player adds and modifies combinations of abilities or resources to assemble a virtuous circle of increasingly powerful and productive outcomes.

Movement

Many board games involve the movement of playing tokens. How these tokens are allowed to move, and when, is governed by movement mechanics.

Some game boards are divided into more or less equally-sized areas, each of which can be occupied by one or more game tokens. (Often such areas are called squares, even if not strictly square in shape.) Movement rules will specify how and when a token can be moved to another area. For example, a player may be allowed to move a token to an adjacent area, but not one further away. Dice are sometimes used to randomize the allowable movements.

Other games, particularly miniatures games are played on surfaces with no marked areas. A common movement mechanism, in this case, is to measure the distance which the miniatures are allowed to move with a ruler. Sometimes, generally in naval wargames, the direction of movement is restricted by use of a turning key.

Resource management
Many games involve the management of resources. Examples of game resources include tokens, money, land, natural resources, human resources and game points. Resource management involves the players establishing relative values for various types of available resources, in the context of the current state of the game and the desired outcome (i.e. winning the game). The game will have rules that determine how players can increase, spend, or exchange their various resources. The skillful management of resources under such rules allows players to influence the outcome of the game.

Risk and reward
Some games include situations where players can "press their luck" in optional actions where the danger of a risk must be weighed against the chance of reward. For example, in Beowulf: The Legend, players may elect to take a "Risk", with success yielding cards and failure weakening the player's ultimate chance of victory.

Role-playing
Role-playing games often rely on mechanics that determine the effectiveness of in-game actions by how well the player acts out the role of a fictional character. While early role-playing games such as Dungeons & Dragons relied heavily on either group consensus or the judgement of a single player (deemed the Dungeon Master or Game Master) or on randomizers such as dice, later generations of narrativist games use more structured and integrated systems to allow role-playing to influence the creative input and output of the players, so both acting out roles and employing rules take part in shaping the gameplay.

Tile-laying

Many games use tiles - flat, rigid pieces of a regular shape - that can be laid down on a flat surface to form a tessellation. Usually, such tiles have patterns or symbols on their surfaces, that combine when tessellated to form game-mechanically significant combinations.

The tiles themselves are often drawn at random by the players, either immediately before placing them on the playing surface, or in groups to form a pool or hand of tiles from which the player may select one to play.

Tiles can be used in two distinct ways:
 The playing of a tile itself is directly significant to the outcome of the game, in that where and when it is played contributes points or resources to the player.
 Tiles are used to build a board upon which other game tokens are placed, and the interaction of those tokens with the tiles provides game points or resources.

Examples of tile mechanics include: Scrabble, in which tiles are letters and players lay them down to form words and score points; and Tikal, in which players lay tiles representing newly explored areas of jungle, through which archaeologists (represented by tokens) must move to score game points.

Worker placement
Worker placement is a game mechanism where players allocate a limited number of tokens ("workers") to multiple stations that provide various defined actions. The worker placement mechanism originates with board games. Stewart Woods identifies Keydom (1998; later remade and updated as Aladdin's Dragons) as the first game to implement the mechanic. Worker placement was popularized by Caylus (2005) and became a staple of the Eurogame genre in the wake of the game's success. Other popular board games that use this mechanism include Stone Age and Agricola. Although the mechanism is chiefly associated with board games, the worker placement concept has been used in analysis of other game types. For instance, Adams and Dormans describe the assigning of tasks to SCV units in the real-time strategy game StarCraft as an example of the worker placement mechanic.

Game modes

A game mode is a distinct configuration that varies gameplay and affects how other game mechanics behave. A game with several modes will present different settings in each one, changing how a particular element of the game is played. One of the most common examples of game mode is the single-player versus multiplayer choice in video games, where multiplayer can further be cooperative or competitive.

Common game modes include a Time Attack Mode, in which the player tries to score, progress or clear levels in a limited amount of time. In Marathon Mode the goal is to clear a certain number of levels or challenges in a continuous streak without losing.

Changing modes while the game is ongoing can be used as a means to increase difficulty and provide additional challenge, or as a reward for player success. Power-ups are modes that last for a few moments or that change only one or a few game rules; for example power pellets in Pac-Man give the temporary ability to eat the enemies for a few seconds.

Other examples include the availability of a sandbox mode without predefined goals or progression. The division of game content in stages or chapters, where each stage expands the rules that a player can use with respect to the previous stage, increases game complexity, and variety. If the game advances through these stages by moving through different areas, these areas are called levels or maps; if the character unlocks new abilities through activities or rewards, they receive a currency called experience points. These points can be used to upgrade or augment various pre-determined abilities.

A game mode may restrict or change the behavior of the available tools ( e.g. play with limited/unlimited ammo, new weapons, obstacles or enemies, a timer, etc.), establish different rules and game mechanics (e.g. altered gravity; win at first touch in a fighting game; play with some cards face-up in a poker game) or even change the overall game goals (following a campaign, story or character's career vs. playing a limited deathmatch or capture the flag set).

Victory conditions
Victory conditions control how a player wins the game. Examples of victory conditions include the necessity of completing a quest in a role-playing video game, or the player being suitably trained in a skill, as is the goal of a business game. Some games also feature a losing condition, such as being checkmated in chess, or being tagged in tag. In such a game, the winner is the only remaining player to have avoided loss. Games are not limited to one victory or loss condition, and can combine several of these at once.

See also
 Ludology
 Game clock
 Kingmaker scenario
 Pie rule
 Gamification - adding a (sometimes very small) amount of game mechanics to a non-game website, piece of software or activity
 Dynamic game difficulty balancing, a technique to change game mechanics based on the player's ability
 Ludeme, an atomic piece of gameplay

References

External links
 Gamification Design Elements at Enterprise Gamification Wiki
 List of games sorted by mechanic at BoardGameGeek
 SCVNGR's Secret Game Mechanics Playdeck at Tech Crunch
 Game Mechanic Explorer

Game design
Video game design
Video game terminology